Compounding a felony was an offence under the common law of England and was classified as a misdemeanour. It consisted of a prosecutor or victim of an offence accepting anything of value under an agreement not to prosecute, or to hamper the prosecution of, a felony.  To "compound", in this context, means to come to a settlement or agreement.
It is not compounding for the victim to accept an offer to return stolen property, or to make restitution, as long as there is no agreement not to prosecute.

Compounding has been replaced by statutory provision in numerous jurisdictions that recognize common law offences:
 England and Wales, replaced with concealing offences or giving false information
 Northern Ireland
 The Republic of Ireland
 New South Wales

Compounding a misdemeanor is not an offence at common law. However, an agreement not to prosecute a misdemeanor is unenforceable as being contrary to public policy.

See also
 Compounding treason, same sense of "compounding" applied to the crime of treason
 Misprision of felony, failing to report knowledge of a felony
 Theftbote, private arrangement between felon and victim, to obviate fines due to the King
 Perverting the course of justice, common-law offence
 Settlement (litigation), permitted in civil law

References

Crimes
English legal terminology
Law of the United Kingdom
Inchoate offenses
Common law offences in England and Wales
Criminal law legal terminology